Duane Dmytryshyn (born June 11, 1971) is a former Canadian football player who played with the Calgary Stampeders, Toronto Argonauts and Saskatchewan Roughriders as a wide receiver. Dmytryshyn caught 101 passes for 1,609 yards and 9 receiving touchdowns in his career. He also rushed for 80 yards and 1 touchdown.

He won a provincial high school title in 1988 as a running back at Marion M. Graham Collegiate, where he also participated in basketball and track, and was a part of the first Saskatchewan Huskies team to win a Vanier Cup in 1990.

After his playing career he became a wide receivers coach with his college team. He was inducted into the Saskatoon Sports Hall of Fame in 2016, and soon after became a teacher at King George community school in Saskatoon Saskatchewan. Dmytryshyn is of Ukrainian descent.

References 

Living people
1971 births
Sportspeople from Saskatoon
Players of Canadian football from Saskatchewan
Canadian football wide receivers
Calgary Stampeders players
Toronto Argonauts players
Saskatchewan Roughriders players
Saskatchewan Huskies football players
Canadian people of Ukrainian descent